Mandra is a settlement in the Abdera municipal unit, Xanthi regional unit of Greece. 

Populated places in Xanthi (regional unit)